Moishe Postone (April 17, 1942 – March 19, 2018) was a Canadian historian and social theorist. He was a professor of history at the University of Chicago, where he was part of the Committee on Jewish Studies.

Life and career 
Postone was born on April 17, 1942, the son of a Canadian rabbi. He received his PhD from University of Frankfurt in 1983.

His research interests included modern European intellectual history; social theory, especially critical theories of modernity; 20th-century Germany; antisemitism; and contemporary global transformations. He was co-editor with Craig Calhoun and Edward LiPuma of Bourdieu: Critical Perspectives and author of Time, Labor and Social Domination: A Reinterpretation of Marx's Critical Theory. He was also co-editor with Eric Santner of Catastrophe and Meaning: The Holocaust and the Twentieth Century, a collection of essays that consider the meaning of the Holocaust in twentieth-century history and its influence on historical practice. Postone's work has had a large influence on the anti-Germans.

He was originally denied tenure by the University of Chicago's sociology department, sparking a great deal of public resentment from graduate students whom he had been involved in teaching. He was later granted tenure by the history department.

Postone was the Thomas E. Donnelley Professor of Modern History and co-director of the Chicago Center for Contemporary Theory.

Postone died on 19 March 2018.

Capitalism as a historical specificity

A heterodox Marxist 
In 1978, Postone started a critical analysis on Marx's theory of value. However, his most distinguished main work, Time, Labor and Social Domination, was published in 1993 (translated into French in 2009 and Japanese in 2012).

In his works he proposed a fundamental reinterpretation of Karl Marx's critique of political economy, focusing on Marx's original concepts value, capital and labour. Inspired by heterodox Marxist thinkers such as Isaak Rubin, Roman Rosdolsky, etc., and certain authors of the Frankfurt School, for example Alfred Sohn-Rethel, who remained marginal to that school, he shows that the assumptions of the 'pessimistic turn' of Horkheimer were historically rather than theoretically founded. Postone interprets critical writings on Marx's economics, especially in its Capital 1 edition, and Grundrisse, as the development of a social-mediational theory of value.

Marx's Capital: a critique immanent to its purpose 
Postone thought that in writing the Grundrisse Marx concludes that adequate critical theory must be completely immanent to its purpose. The criticism cannot be taken from a point of view external to its object, but must appear in the mode of presentation itself. Das Kapital is so structured, for Postone, with a surface level immanent to political economics discourse and a deeper layer that grounds this discourse, which makes it particularly difficult to interpret. Indeed, precisely because of the inherent nature of the format Marx uses, the object of the critique of Marx has often been taken as the standpoint of this criticism. For example, not only is the category of exchange value historically specific to the capitalist period, but value's basis, the capitalist form of wage labour, must also be historically specific, and does not apply conceptually to other periods. The methodological sections of the Grundrisse clarify therefore not only Marx's presentation, but other sections make explicit that the categories of capital such as value and exchange-labour, are historically specific to the capitalist social formation. The so-called labour theory of value is not a theory of the material wealth created by labour but is in a parallel manner also seen when looked at transhistorically as "human metabolism with nature." Precisely because it is not structured immanently, the Grundrisse provides a key to read Capital. This is the key to the reinterpretation of the work of mature Marx, with which Postone works.

Against the traditional critique of capital from the standpoint of labour 
Starting in this demonstration of the historically specific character of what Marx critiques, Postone then provided a new critical theory that attacks the very essence of capitalism: the form of labour specific to the capitalist social formation. Indeed, in non-capitalist societies, work is distributed by overt social relations. An individual acquires goods produced by others through the medium of undisguised social relations. Work activities derive their meaning and are determined by personal relationships, openly social and qualitatively specific (differentiated by social group, social status, the wide range of customs, traditional ties, etc.). But in a capitalist social formation, the objectification of labour is the means by which goods produced by others is acquired; we work to acquire other products so someone other than producer that uses the product (as well as use value) - the producer, it serves as a means for acquiring work products from other producers. It is in this sense that a product is a commodity. It is both use-value for each other and medium of exchange for the producer. This means that the work has a dual function; on one hand, it is a specific type of work that produces goods individuals to others, but on the other hand, the work, regardless of its specific content, is the producer of means to acquire the products of others. This feature of the work, which is specific to the social life in capitalism, is the basis of modern socialization, is called "abstract labour". In the functioning of these new social relationships, labour under capitalism is no longer an external activity to capitalism. It is the foundation of capitalism, and so it is the labour that must be abolished.

"Commodity fetishism" 
It appears increasingly today that the new concept of "commodity fetishism", which has nothing to do with a hoax of consciousness (an inverted representation), is the central part of the intellectual heritage of Marx. "Commodity fetishism" is not a misrepresentation, nor an exaggerated adoration, of goods. The "fetish" instead is to be referred to the structure of the commodity. It is then a theory of "objective fetishism" (Jappe) or radicalized, that is to say, so long as value (the objectification of the specific function of the spirit of labour under capitalism), the goods and money, society is actually governed by the self-movement of created things themselves, and not by the subjective manipulation of the ruling classes. The subjects are not men, but it is rather their objectified relationships that are at the heart of socialization under capitalism. Fetishism, Postone notes, must be analyzed "in terms of the structure of social relations constituted by forms of praxis and its seizure by objectifying the category of capital (and hence value). The Subject for Marx, like Hegel is so abstract and can not be identified with any social actor whatsoever." This is the world where abstract labour (which is not immaterial labour) becomes the social bond, social mediation that mediates itself, reducing actual work to a simple expression of abstract labour. Abstract labour is then the source of alienation. The self-moving subject, Spirit, Geist, is misrecognized in Hegel, it is described by Marx as Capital and its self-valorization. It is not, Postone suggests, similar to Lukacs' use of Hegel, wherein the proletariat are identified as Spirit, for then spirit would be labour not emancipation.

It is from this concept that we can build a radical critique of the commodity, money, value, labour and politics, that is to say, a critique that is not limited to describing the struggles around management and distribution, the "class struggle" as traditionally understood, but recognizes that these categories themselves are problematic: they are specific only to capitalist modernity, and are responsible for its destructiveness and self-destructiveness. Pointing out that the market is a mere mechanism of distribution, and so secondary to the core of capitalism, allows Postone to broaden the historical scope of Marx's theory so that it can, with equal validity, be applied to what was the USSR. In the USSR the main difference was that instead of a market handling distribution it was planners; however, the abstract exchange of labour, which is the core of capitalism for Postone, was as it was in the West.

Modern antisemitism and the destruction of the abstract 
In his 1986 article, "Anti-Semitism and National Socialism", Postone developed new thinking on modern antisemitism, and particularly on National Socialist ideology. Postone saw antisemitism as a major element in the development of a socio-historical theory of consciousness determined by social forms that are subjected to socialization under capitalism. What is said about modern antisemitism may also describe a trend of vulgar anti-capitalism that seeks the personification of the elements of capitalism that are so hated. Postone showed that modern antisemitism is very different from most forms of racism and Christian antisemitism; it differs from them because it casts a huge global invisible power of international Jewry, the idea of a global conspiracy that is intrinsic to modern antisemitism.

Postone analyzed antisemitism against the Marxian notion of the dual character of the commodity category. And he observed that the characteristics that antisemitism attributes to Jews are the same as for value: abstraction, invisibility, automation, impersonal domination. Postone argued that the form of socialization under capitalism (the historically specific function of the spirit of labour under capitalism) makes it possible to separate the concrete (as socially "natural" sound, true, etc.) and the abstract (as socially constructed, historically specific and contingent). This opposition between the concrete and the abstract, determined by social forms, pervades all forms of subjectivity, and thus helps to understand a central feature of the National Socialist ideology, because this ideology was not fundamentally anti-modern and it would be wrong to label it as such. It is true, Postone argued, that Nazism claimed to defend the peasantry and craftsmanship, but it also valued modern technological and industrial production. Nazism was rather a vulgar form of anti-capitalism. The rejection of the bourgeoisie and its values is present in Nazism, but Postone saw Nazi ideology as the affirmation of the concrete dimension of capitalism - which includes technology and industrial production, as well as the peasantry and manual labour - as the heart of a healthy, organic social life. This stood in contrast with the abstract dimension represented by finance capital. The abstract is instead rejected - and it is personified by the Jews. Postone analyzed the figure of the Jew in modern antisemitism as the embodiment of abstract value, and extermination camps as a misbegotten notion of a "factory" to destroy value.

Publications 
 Books
 Critique du fétiche-capital: Le capitalisme, l’antisemitisme et la gauche. Paris: Presses Universitaires de France, 2013.
 History and Heteronomy: Critical Essays. Tokyo: University of Tokyo Center for Philosophy, 2009.
 Marx Reloaded. Repensar la teoría crítica del capitalismo. Madrid: Editorial Traficantes de Sueños, 2007.
 Deutschland, die Linke und der Holocaust - Politische Interventionen. Freiburg, Germany: Ca Ira Verlag, 2005.
 Catastrophe and Meaning: The Holocaust and the Twentieth Century. [Co-editor with Eric Santner] Chicago: University of Chicago Press, 2003.
 Marx est-il devenu muet: Face à la mondialisation? Paris: les éditions de l'Aube, 2003.
 Time, Labor and Social Domination: A Reinterpretation of Marx's Critical Theory. New York and Cambridge: Cambridge University Press, 1993.
 Bourdieu: Critical Perspectives. co-editor with Craig Calhoun and Edward LiPuma, Chicago and Cambridge: University of Chicago Press and Polity Press, 1993.

 Articles and chapters
 "The Current Crisis and the Anachronism of Value: A Marxian Reading." Continental Thought & Theory: A Journal of Intellectual Freedom 1, no. 4 (2017): 38-54. 
 "History and Helplessness: Mass Mobilization and Contemporary Forms of Anticapitalism" Public Culture 18.1 Duke UP 2006.
 "Critique, State, and Economy" in Fred Rush (ed.) The Cambridge Companion to Critical Theory, Cambridge: Cambridge University Press, 2004.
 "The Holocaust and the Trajectory of the Twentieth Century," in M. Postone and E. Santner (eds.) Catastrophe and Meaning. University of Chicago Press, 2003.
 "Lukács and the Dialectical Critique of Capitalism," in R. Albritton and J. Simoulidis, (eds.), New Dialectics and Political Economy, Houndsmill, Basingstoke and New York: Palgrave Macmillan, 2003.
 "Hannah Arendts Eichmann in Jerusalem: Die unaufgelöste Antinomie von Universalität und Besonderem," in Gary Smith (ed.), Hannah Arendt Revisited: "Eichmann in Jerusalem" und die Folgen, Suhrkamp Verlag, Frankfurt a.M., 2000.
 "Contemporary Historical Transformations: Beyond Postindustrial and Neo-Marxist Theories," Current Perspectives in Social Theory. Vol. 19, 1999. Stamford, Conn: JAI Press Inc., 1999.
 "Deconstruction as Social Critique: Derrida on Marx and the New World Order," [review essay on Jacques Derrida, Specters of Marx] in History and Theory, October, 1998.
 "Rethinking Marx in a Postmarxist World," in Charles Camic (ed.), Reclaiming the Sociological Classics. Cambridge, Mass.: Blackwell Publishers, 1998.
 "Political Theory and Historical Analysis," in C. Calhoun (ed.), Habermas and the Public Sphere, Cambridge, Mass.: MIT Press, 1992.
 "History and Critical Social Theory," (Review essay on Jürgen Habermas, The Theory of Communicative Action) in Contemporary Sociology. Vol. 19, No. 2, March, 1990.
 "After the Holocaust: History and Identity in West Germany," in K. Harms, L.R. Reuter and V. Dürr (eds.), Coping with the Past: Germany and Austria after 1945, Madison: University of Wisconsin Press, 1990.
 "Anti-Semitism and National Socialism," in A. Rabinbach and J. Zipes (eds.), Germans and Jews Since the Holocaust, New York: Holmes and Meier, 1986.
 "On Nicolaus' 'Introduction' to the Grundrisse". Telos 22 (Winter 1974-5). New York: Telos Press.

See also 
 Post-Marxism
 Value criticism
Critique of political economy

References 

Russell Rockwell (2018), Hegel, Marx, and the Necessity and Freedom Dialectic: Marxist-Humanism and Critical Theory in the United States. Cham, Switzerlnd: Palgrave Macmillan. See especially Chapter 7: Moishe Postone's Deepened Interpretation of Marx's Value Theory: Grundrisse (pp. 145–60); and Chapter 8: Moishe Postone's Deepened Interpretation of Marx's Value Theory: Capital (pp. 161–194). https://www.palgrave.com/gp/book/9783319756103

External links 
 Faculty profile at the University of Chicago
 Intervention d'Etienne Balibar & Moishe Postone Congrès Marx International V : Altermondialisme/ anticapitalisme. Pour une cosmopolitique alternative. Octobre 2007
 Conference of Moishe Postone
 Interview with Moishe Postone

1942 births
2018 deaths
20th-century Canadian Jews
20th-century Canadian male writers
20th-century Canadian philosophers
20th-century Canadian economists
20th-century educators
20th-century Canadian historians
21st-century Canadian essayists
21st-century Canadian male writers
21st-century Canadian philosophers
21st-century Canadian  economists
21st-century educators
21st-century Canadian historians
Canadian anti-capitalists
Canadian educators
Jewish Canadian writers
Canadian male essayists
Canadian male non-fiction writers
Canadian philosophers
Canadian social commentators
Canadian sociologists
Critical theorists
Critics of political economy
Deaths from cancer in Illinois
Jewish American historians
Jewish philosophers
Philosophers of culture
Philosophers of economics
Philosophers of history
Philosophers of social science
Philosophy academics
Philosophy writers
Political philosophers
Social philosophers
Scholars of antisemitism
Theorists on Western civilization
University of Chicago faculty
Writers about activism and social change
Writers about globalization